Indiana Landmarks is America's largest private statewide historic preservation organization. Founded in 1960 as Historic Landmarks Foundation of Indiana by a volunteer group of civic and business leaders led by Indianapolis pharmaceutical executive Eli Lilly, the organization is a private non-governmental organization with nearly 6,000 members and an endowment of over $40-million. The organization simplified its name to Indiana Landmarks in 2010.

Indiana Landmarks owns and restores historic buildings, buys and sells vacant and endangered property, and helps people throughout Indiana save and restore historic places through a variety of programs including grants, loans, and advocacy.

Indiana Landmarks employs staff at its state headquarters in Indianapolis and in regional offices throughout the state of Indiana. Regional offices are located in South Bend, Gary, New Albany, Aurora, Evansville, Cambridge City, Wabash, and Terre Haute. The organization's state headquarters are located at the former Central Avenue United Methodist Church in Indianapolis, now known as Indiana Landmarks Center. In addition to Indiana Landmarks Center, Indiana Landmarks owns and operates three historic properties as event and rental venues: the Morris-Butler House in Indianapolis, the Huddleston Farmhouse Inn Museum in Cambridge City, Indiana, and Veraestau historic site in Aurora, Indiana. Landmarks' honorary board chair is Indiana's former Chief Justice Randall T. Shepard.

The organization's first project was restoration of the 1865 Morris-Butler House in Indianapolis. Eli Lilly personally underwrote the acquisition and restoration of the house as a museum of Victorian decorative arts. Though the Morris-Butler House no longer operates as a museum, it is part of the Indiana Landmarks Center campus and functions as an event and rental facility.

One of Indiana Landmarks' largest projects was the $30-million+ restoration of the West Baden Springs Hotel's exterior and public spaces. Indiana Landmarks helped lead the effort to bring riverboat gaming to Orange County, Indiana as a way to revitalize the French Lick Resort Casino and the West Baden Springs Hotel.

New name and headquarters
In April 2010, in conjunction with the organization's 50th anniversary, Indiana Landmarks announced its name change from Historic Landmarks Foundation of Indiana. At the same time, it announced that medical device entrepreneur Bill Cook and his wife, Gayle pledged $17-million to renovate the former Central Avenue United Methodist Church at 12th Street and Central Avenue in the Old Northside Historic District of Indianapolis as a performance space and new headquarters for the organization, to be known as Indiana Landmarks Center.

Endangered landmarks
Each May (National Historic Preservation Month), Indiana Landmarks announces a list of the state's 10 Most Endangered landmarks. Circumstances that land properties among the 10 Most Endangered generally involve one or more of the following factors: demolition threat, abandonment, neglectful owner, dilapidation, obsolete use, lack of money for repairs, unreasonable above-market sale price, out-of-the-way location, or encroaching sprawl. Indiana Landmarks uses the 10 Most Endangered list to bring public attention to the imperiled sites and mobilize support for their preservation.

2015 Ten Most Endangered list
 Bedford Elks Building, Bedford
 Camp Chesterfield, Chesterfield
 First Presbyterian Church & Lafayette Building, South Bend
 Indiana County Homes
 Indiana Medical History Museum, Indianapolis
 IOOF United Brethren Block, Huntington
 McCurdy Hotel, Evansville
 McDonald House, Attica
 Mills House, Greenwood
 Rivoli Theater, Indianapolis

2016 Ten Most Endangered list

 Beech Church, Carthage 
 Hazelwood, Muncie 
 Speakman House, Rising Sun
 Washington County Courthouse, Salem
 Monon High Bridge, Delphi
 Pryor’s Country Place, Fox Lake near Angola 
 Ford Motor Company Assembly Branch, Indianapolis
 Southside Turnverein Hall, Indianapolis 
 Camp Chesterfield, Chesterfield
 Rivoli Theatre, Indianapolis

2017 Ten Most Endangered list

 Marion National Bank Building, Marion
 Newkirk Mansion, Connersville
 Former Fire Station 18, Indianapolis
 Old Marquette School, South Bend
 Old YMCA, Terre Haute
 Pryor's Country Place, Fox Lake
 Round and polygonal barns, statewide
 Simpson Hall, Indiana School for the Deaf, Indianapolis
 Speakman House, Rising Sun
 Washington County Courthouse, Salem

2018 Ten Most Endangered list

 Cannelton Historic District, Cannelton
 Commandant’s Row at Indiana Veterans’ Home, West Lafayette
 The Courtyard Inn, Rising Sun
 Cravenhurst Barn, Madison
 Muncie Fieldhouse, Muncie
 National Bank Building, Marion 
 North Christian Church, Columbus
 Old Masonic Hall, Knightstown
 Rocky Edge, Terre Haute
 Saint Joseph’s College campus, Rensselaer

Annual awards
Indiana Landmarks issues several annual awards, including:

 Cook Cup for Outstanding Restoration
 Sandi Servaas Memorial Award
 Williamson Prize

Together with the Indiana Farm Bureau, Indiana Landmarks also co-sponsors the John Arnold Rural Preservation Award.

References

Further reading
The Encyclopedia of Indianapolis David J. Bodenhamer, Robert Graham Barrows, David Gordon Vanderstel

External links

National Trust for Historic Preservation

 
Historic preservation organizations in the United States
Organizations established in 1960
State history organizations of the United States
Non-profit organizations based in Indianapolis
Museum organizations